Manuel Chorens García (born 22 January 1916, date of death unknown) was a Cuban footballer.

International career
He represented Cuba at the 1938 FIFA World Cup in France. In his three matches, Chorens did not score a goal.

References

External links
 

1916 births
Year of death missing
Association football defenders
Cuban footballers
Cuba international footballers
1938 FIFA World Cup players